The Women's individual sprint took place at 6 and 7 October 2010 at the Indira Gandhi Arena.

Preliminaries
200 metre time trial, top 8 advanced to the quarterfinals.

Results

Quarterfinals
The eight cyclists qualified were paired for a best two-out-of-three series of 200 metre races. None of the pairings required a third race.

Race for 5th-8th Places

Semifinals

Finals

External links
 Reports

Track cycling at the 2010 Commonwealth Games
Cycling at the Commonwealth Games – Women's sprint
Comm